St. Anthony's Peak is a peak on the island of Saint Kitts in Saint Kitts and Nevis. 

It is the highest point on the island's Southeast Peninsula, rising to 319 m (1047 ft) above the Great Salt Pond.

See also
 Geography of Saint Kitts and Nevis

Mountains of Saint Kitts and Nevis
Saint Kitts (island)